The Seistan Force, originally called East Persia Cordon, was a force of British Indian Army troops set up to prevent infiltration by German and Ottoman agents from Persia (Iran) into Afghanistan during World War I. The force was established to protect British interests in Persia from subversion by German agents, most notably Wilhelm Wassmuss. The force was also tasked to intercept and destroy the Turco-German expedition to Kabul that sought Afghan alliance in the Central war effort and Afghan assistance to wartime revolutionary conspiracies in India.

Unit history
In August 1914 (at the start of World War I) a small force, under the orders of the 2nd Quetta Brigade, was maintained in Western Balochistan to suppress arms traffic. In July 1915 this force was expanded and became the East Persia Cordon to prevent enemy infiltration from Persia into Afghanistan. A similar Russian Cordon was established to prevent infiltration into north-west Afghanistan. From March 1916 the force became the Seistan Force under the commander-in-chief in India. Following the Revolution in Russia, the Malleson mission was sent to Trans-Caspia and the Seistan Force became the Lines of Communication for the Mission from September 1918 under the orders of the 4th (Quetta) Division. With the withdrawal of the force from Trans-Caspia, the troops in Persia were withdrawn and the last elements left in November 1920.

Despatches
The following is part of the text of a despatch by General Sir Charles Monro, Commander-in-Chief, India, on military operations in the Indian Empire from March 1916 to March 1917, published in the London Gazette on 31 October 1917:

Commanding officers
 Lt Colonel J. M. Wikely, August 1915
 Brig-General Reginald Dyer, March 1916
 Brig-General C. O. O. Tanner, October 1916
 Lt Colonel (later Brig-General) G. A. Dale, May 1917

See also
 Dunsterforce

Footnotes

References

Further reading

 

Hindu–German Conspiracy
Military history of the United Kingdom during World War I
Campaigns and theatres of World War I